Mental Madhilo is a 2017 Indian Telugu-language romantic comedy film written and directed by Vivek Athreya in his directorial debut, and produced by Raj Kandukuri (well known for Pelli Choopulu) for Dharmapatha Creations. The film features Sree Vishnu, Nivetha Pethuraj, and Amrutha Srinivasan in lead roles with Sivaji Raja, Madhumani, Raj Madiraju and Anita Chowadary in pivotal roles. This film marks the Telugu debut of Nivetha Pethuraj and Srinivasan. Songs and background score for the movie are composed and arranged by Prashanth R Vihari. The film's title was taken from a song from OK Bangaram.

Plot 
Decision making? Well that's tough given that options before you are equally luring. That's near to impossible for a guy, Aravind Krishna (Sree Vishnu) is a guy affected to Borderline personality disorder a fickle-minded  person since childhood who gets confused when faced with regular options. The kind that could answer everything on a theoretical paper but returns the objective paper blank. Not just getting confused, like any one of us generally happen to be,  but yearns for the option that he didn't choose after deciding. To add to this, an incident from his 12th year makes him uncomfortable to talk to or be around girls. As he becomes older, the situation doesn't get any better. Aravind, now 29 years old, almost gives up on the hope of getting married after messing up 12 match makings. Reluctantly, he attends the 13th and to his surprise, he finds himself at ease when he talks to Swetcha (Nivetha Pethuraj), a clear-headed straight forward girl in contrast to Aravind.

Swetcha who sees the plainness in his heart agrees to marry him. The two spend some time together before getting engaged, as they get to know about each other they start liking each other. Being with Swetcha helps Aravind to get over his discomfort with girls. While waiting on their engagement, Aravind is obliged to go to Mumbai for a project. On his way, he meets a joyous and unpredictable girl, called Renuka (Amrutha Srinivasan), from Vijayawada and architectural student who leaves an impression during their bus journey, but disappears as he reaches Mumbai. She is a strong believer in destiny and Aravind too subconsciously starts believing in it and starts searching for her in Mumbai. The same destiny has them meet again in Mumbai and she became a roommate with Aravind along with Saki (Kireeti Damaraju) and some other friends. Meanwhile, Aravind finds himself drawn to her as he spends more and more time with her. He becomes infatuated with her and, one night, they both share a kiss. Later, she shares her past saying that she had a boy friend, who died in an accident. She confesses her feelings for Aravind and abruptly vacates the apartment the next day. In a confused state of mind, Aravind calls off the engagement with Swetcha but gets nervous and manages it as a prank. The next day, Swetcha gives a surprise visit to Mumbai and befriends all of his friends. She enquires about Renu, they somehow conveniently take care of the situation, but Swetcha manages to find her in a restaurant, and they both become good friends.

While going back, Swecha admits to Aravind that she understands everything about Aravind and Renu,  shows anguish on him and leaves to Hyderabad. In Hyderabad, Aravind's father (Sivaji Raja) makes him realise how the risk of choice making manifests a positive change in life, by narrating a real-life example he had to face in his youth. Realising his mistake, Aravind, for the first time, takes a decision and goes over to apologise Swetcha, but to no avail. He meets Renu, confesses his feelings for Swetcha and apologises Renu. Albiet hurt somewhat, Renu encourages Aravind to propose to Swetcha and they both part their ways. The same night, Aravind goes to Swetcha's home to talk about it, but her mom (Anitha Chowdary) informa him that she is on a bus which is going out of station.  Aravind catches the bus along with his father successfully. He proves that he has overcome his disorder by making a firm decision, and apologises to Swetcha. After a moment, Swetcha accepts his proposal, 
but with a tight slap, and they get together again. 

His father comically encounters another passenger on the bus(Nara Rohit) and invites him to his son's marriage. Aravind and Swetcha get married and lived happily.

Cast 

 Sree Vishnu as Aravind Krishna
 Nivetha Pethuraj as Swetcha
 Amrutha Srinivasan as Renuka 
 Keshav Deepak as Manu
 Kireeti Damaraju as Saki 
 Shivaji Raja as Arvind Krishna's father
 Madhumani as Aravind Krishna's mother
 Raj Madiraju as Swetcha's father
 Anita Chowadary as Swetcha's mother
 Dinesh Koushika as Aravind's friend
 Appaji Ambarisha Darbha as office colleague
 Jahanvi Dassety 
 Sujata
 Nara Rohit as a bus passenger (Cameo Appearance)

Soundtrack

Music composed by Prashanth R Vihari.

Production
The film was written by Vivek Athreya, who also made his directorial debut with this film. It completed its production in 40 days, across 3 schedules  and is shot in Hyderabad, Mumbai and Goa.

Once the production was completed, the film was taken over and presented by  Suresh Productions.

Release 
After Suresh Productions took over the film, there were regular previews to audience and critics a few days before the release. The film was released in India on 24 November 2017. Overseas, it was distributed by Freeze Frame Films LLC.

Reception 
The film has garnered positive feedback from the audience and critics. Actor Sree Vishnu received accolades for his ease of acting from critics and so did Nivetha Pethuraj, the female lead. The film had a good gross collection across the released theatres and made its mark overseas. Producer Raj Kandukuri along with actor Nani released its first song, "Gummadikaya Halwa", on 30 June at SIIMA 2017.

Awards

References

External links